The 2022 Christchurch mayoral election was part of the 2022 New Zealand local elections that took place on 8 October 2022, with the new mayor's term lasting to 2025. There are no term limits, but the incumbent three-term mayor, Lianne Dalziel, had announced that she would not be seeking a fourth term. One of the key election issues was whether or not to build a stadium which would cost $683m.

Candidates
Phil Mauger, who was first elected as a city councillor at the 2019 local elections, was the first to declare his candidacy 14 months out from the election. He said in August 2021 that he would stand for mayor only and not also contest his incumbent council seat. The Wizard of New Zealand was the next to declare his candidacy in December 2021. David Meates, the former Canterbury District Health Board chief executive, announced his candidacy in June 2022. A debate between the 2 frontrunner candidates Phil Mauger and David Meates was hosted by stuff on 16 Sep 2022.

Declared
Carl Bromley (Independent – I Hear I Care), founder of the Life Connection Missionary Baptist Fellowship
The Wizard of New Zealand (Independent)
Mark Chirnside (Chirny for Mayor), business owner
Tubby Hansen (Economic Euthenics), perennial candidate
Stephen Jelley (Stop the Stadium)
Drucilla Kingi-Patterson (Independent)
Phil Mauger (Let's Get Stuff Done), business owner and city councillor
David Meates (Listens, Leads and Gets Results), former Canterbury District Health Board chief executive
Nikora Nitro (Independent)
Sam Park
Peter Wakeman (Independent), perennial candidate

Declined
Jimmy Chen, Christchurch councillor
Melanie Coker, Christchurch councillor
Pauline Cotter, Christchurch councillor
Lianne Dalziel, incumbent mayor
Ruth Dyson, former Labour MP
Anne Galloway, Christchurch councillor
James Gough, Christchurch councillor
Yani Johanson, Christchurch councillor
Jake McLellan, Christchurch councillor
Garry Moore, former Christchurch mayor
Eugenie Sage, Green MP
Andrew Turner, Christchurch deputy mayor
Nicky Wagner, former National MP
Duncan Webb, Labour MP
Megan Woods, Labour MP
Mike Davidson, Christchurch councillor
Raf Manji, former city councillor, leader of The Opportunities Party
John Minto, activist and 2019 mayoral candidate
Darryll Park, business owner and 2019 mayoral candidate
Sara Templeton, Christchurch councillor

Endorsements

Opinion polling

Results

See also
 2022 Christchurch local elections

References

Mayoral elections in Christchurch
2022 elections in New Zealand
2020s in Christchurch
October 2022 events in New Zealand